Oderisi da Gubbio (Gubbio, circa 1240 - Rome, 1299)  was an Italian painter and manuscript illuminator of the 13th century. Few details of his life are known. Documents to his activities in Bologna span from 1262 to 1271. In 1292, he was called to Rome by Pope Boniface VIII to illuminate manuscripts in the papal library.

Attributed to Oderisi are:
Illuminated missals from the  Canonica della Basilica di San Pietro of Rome;
Digestium infortiatum of Justinian, National Library of Turin;
 Conradin Bible, Walters Art Gallery, Baltimore, Maryland, USA;
 Psalter 346, University Library of Bologna;
 A Bible, Biblioteca Apostolica Vaticana.

Oderisi in Dante's Divine Comedy
Oderisi appears in Canto XI of Dante Alighieri's Purgatorio on the terrace of pride. There, souls repent for their prideful past by carrying heavy stones on their backs that force them to hunch over with their faces to the ground. Oderisi is described to represent the pride of art and fame. He recognizes Dante from beneath his burden and calls out to the poet who then remembers his face. Dante responds to Oderisi and refers to him as "the honor of Gubbio and of that art which they in Paris call illumination." Oderisi replies as an example of humility, brushing off Dante's praise stating that his pupil, Franco Bolognese, is more worthy of it. He then engages with Dante emphasizing the ills brought about by earthly vanity and the reality of fleeting earthly fame:

References

1299 deaths
1240s births
13th-century Italian painters
Italian male painters
Manuscript illuminators
People from Gubbio